The Music Shop was a short lived music program on NBC which premiered in 1959 in a Sunday time slot. Hosted by and starring Buddy Bregman, the show attempted to capitalize on the popularity of the related series The Dick Clark Show.

Its first show featured Bobby Darin, Ritchie Valens, The Collins Kids, Gary Crosby, and Sam Butera.

Episodes

References

1950s American variety television series
1950s American music television series
Pop music television series
NBC original programming
1959 American television series debuts
1959 American television series endings
English-language television shows
First-run syndicated television programs in the United States